Chamanthedon brillians is a moth of the family Sesiidae. It is known from the Republic of the Congo, Equatorial Guinea, Gabon and Sierra Leone.

References

Sesiidae
Moths of Africa
Moths described in 1899